This is a listing of notable people born in, or notable for their association with, Bengkulu.



A
 Hans Avé Lallemant, geologist

B
 Frans de Bruijn Kops, Olympic footballer

D
 Darussalam, actor

F
 Fatmawati, National Hero of Indonesia, 1st First Lady of Indonesia

S
 Asmar Latin Sani, suicide bomber
 Ferdinand Sinaga, professional footballer

Bengkulu